Carabus italicus rostagnoi is a black coloured subspecies of ground beetle in the subfamily Carabinae, that is endemic to Central Italy.

References

italicus rostagnoi
Beetles described in 1904
Endemic fauna of Italy